The Regional Bus and Rail Company of Ticino (known by its Italian initials FART) is a limited company in the Swiss southern canton of Ticino, which provides the urban and suburban bus network in and around Locarno in Switzerland. It operates the cable cars between Verdasio and Rasa, Ticino, and between Intragna – Pila – Costa on behalf of the owning companies. Together with the Italian company  (SSIF) they operate the railway through the Swiss Centovalli and the Italian Valle Vigezzo, which connects the Gotthard trans-Alpine rail route at Locarno railway station with the Simplon trans-Alpine route at Domodossola in Italy. There are 10 stations on the Swiss side of the frontier and 12 stations on the Italian side, the complete rail journey takes about 1 hour and 45 minutes.

A formal request for the licensing of a rail network was made by the mayor of Locarno, Francesco Balli, in 1898, but although construction of the Centovalli Railway was begun in May 1913, the collapse of the financing bank later that year, together with the intervention of the First World War meant that construction was not resumed until August 1921, with the line being constructed from each end and meeting on 27 March 1923 and public service being inaugurated on 25 November 1923. On 12 November 1918 Italy and Switzerland had signed a contract about
the construction of a narrow gauge railway, Locarno - Domodossola. This contract fixed the cross acceptance of Italian vehicles in Switzerland and vice versa without needing a second approval.

As well as an important public service, the route of the railway is extremely scenic, and the route is popular with tourists.

FART is a member of the Arcobaleno tariff network.

Rolling stock 
Traffic on the Centovallina and Vigezzina is fully in the hand of electric motor coaches. A series of 12 articulated EMUs ABe 4/6, built in 1992 by Vevey Technologies made up most through workings until 2007, often working in pairs. 8 ABe 4/6 51-58 are owned by FART, 4 ABe 4/6 61–64 by SSIF.

9 articulated railcars from 1959 to 68, three-element ABe 8/8 21-24 and two-element ABe or ABDe 6/6 31-35 can not work in MU but can pull a trailer or two (101...111 and 201 from 1923, 120-123 from 1964, 130 from 1948).

2004 SSIF ordered three three-car panoramic multiple units from the Officine Ferroviaire Veronesi and Škoda Works. Soon the order was changed to three four-car trains. Delivery took place in 2007.
 Driving motor, Domodossola direction: ABe 4/4 Pp 81, 83, 85
 Driving motor, Locarno direction: Be 4/4 Pp 82, 84, 86
 Non-driving motor: Be 4/4 Pi 87, 88, 89
 Trailer: Rimorchiata P 810, 811, 812
Classifications ABe and Be don't match with classes available in every vehicle. In July 2008 the following consists were working:
 85 - 812 - 89 - 86  1st class at the Locarno end (whole coach 86)
 83 - 87 - 810 - 82 1st class at the Domodossola end (coach 83)
 81 - 88 - 811 - 84  1st class at both ends (end compartment of coaches 81 and 84)

Off-season, these consists may be reduced to three vehicles. As a replacement, SSIF had ABe 8/8 24 fitted with a new cabody, looking very similar to the new trains. However, number of seats is much smaller than in a new train, thus it must be followed by an ABe 4/6 to allow transporting all passengers.

References

External links 

 Centovalli Railway website (in Italian, German and English)
 SSIF website (in Italian)

FART
Transport in Ticino
Railway companies established in 1923
Swiss companies established in 1923
Transport companies established in 1923